Arma (sometimes stylised as ARMA) is a series of first-person tactical military shooters, developed by Czech studio Bohemia Interactive and originally released for Microsoft Windows. It features large elements of realism and simulation; a blend of large-scale military conflict spread across large areas alongside the more close quartered battles. The series were originally conceived as a spiritual successor to Operation Flashpoint: Cold War Crisis, after Bohemia Interactive lost the Intellectual rights to the series. The first game was released in 2006 and the most recent in 2022. Later games have been released on Microsoft Windows, Linux, Android and iOS.

History

Arma: Armed Assault 

Arma: Armed Assault, known as Arma: Combat Operations in the United States, is the first Arma game, released for Microsoft Windows in November 2006 (Czech Republic/Germany), February 2007 (Europe) and May 2007 (U.S.) using the Real Virtuality 2 game engine.

Arma: Queen's Gambit 

Queen's Gambit is downloadable content for Armed Assault; it was released in September 2007 (EU) using the Real Virtuality game engine.

Arma 2 

Arma 2 is the second full Arma game, released for Microsoft Windows and released in June 2009 using the Real Virtuality game engine. The mod DayZ was released on this title, which requires the other standalone game title Operation Arrowhead.

Arma 2: Operation Arrowhead 

Arma 2: Operation Arrowhead is a standalone game for Microsoft Windows, released in June 2010 with the Real Virtuality 3 game engine.

Arma 2: Reinforcements 

Reinforcements is a standalone expansion of the original Arma 2. It includes the downloadable content Arma 2: British Armed Forces and Arma 2: Private Military Company which can be purchased for any standalone Arma 2 title.

Arma: Cold War Assault 

In June 2011, Bohemia Interactive re-released Operation Flashpoint as Arma: Cold War Assault, as Codemasters retain the rights to the Operation Flashpoint trademark. Owners of Operation Flashpoint: Cold War Crisis and the Game of the Year Edition may download and install the latest patch for free, and the game is available for purchase via a number of digital distribution channels. This release does not include the Red Hammer expansion, which was developed by Codemasters. The game uses the same engine, Real Virtuality, as the military simulator VBS1.

Arma 2: Firing Range 
Arma 2: Firing Range is a standalone for Android and iOS and was released in July 2011.

Arma Tactics 

Arma Tactics is a standalone game for Nvidia Shield and other Android devices with Nvidia Tegra3 and Tegra4. It was released in May 2013 using the Unity game engine.

Arma 3 

Arma 3 is a standalone game for Microsoft Windows, released on September 12, 2013, using the Real Virtuality 4 game engine. It was first open to the public on March 5 using Steam's Early Access program. In 2015 and 2016 it was also released for MacOS and Linux.

Arma Mobile Ops 
Arma Mobile Ops is a standalone title for Android and iOS. It was released in June 2016.

Arma Reforger 
Released in 2022 on early access for Microsoft Windows and Xbox Series X/S, Arma Reforger is a standalone preview game in the Enfusion engine for Arma 4.

See also 
Operation Flashpoint

References

External links 

 
Articles which contain graphical timelines
First-person shooters by series
Video game franchises
Video game franchises introduced in 2006